Richard Nathaniel Venable (1756–1838) was a nineteenth-century American politician from Virginia.

Early life
Venable was born at Slate Hill Plantation in Prince Edward County.

In his twenties, he served in the Revolutionary War in the United States Army, and rose to the rank of Lieutenant.

Career
In 1782, Venable earned a Master of Arts degree at Princeton College, and a Bachelor of Laws from the College of William and Mary in 1785.

As an adult, Venable continued to live in Prince Edward County, Virginia. He was elected as a member of the Virginia state Senate as a Whig.

He was the originator and first president of the Upper Appomattox Canal Company. It was incorporated in 1795 completed the Upper Appomattox Canal by 1816 for polled bateaux freighters. It extended from the head of the falls of the Appomattox River at Farmville, a distance of 100 miles to a basin in Petersburg, Virginia. The canal was rebuilt in the 1830s and continued in use until the 1890s. 
 
Venable was elected as a delegate to the Virginia Constitutional Convention of 1829-1830. There he was elected by the Convention to serve on the Committee on the Executive Department. He was one of four delegates elected from the senatorial district made up his home district of Charlotte, Halifax and Prince Edward Counties, serving alongside John Randolph of Roanoke. Venable died in 1838 at Prince Edward County, Virginia.

References

Bibliography

1756 births
1838 deaths
Virginia state senators
People from Prince Edward County, Virginia
College of William & Mary alumni
Princeton University alumni